A pack animal, also known as a sumpter animal or beast of burden, is an individual or type of working animal used by humans as means of transporting materials by attaching them so their weight bears on the animal's back, in contrast to draft animals which pull loads but do not carry them.

Traditional pack animals are diverse including camels, goats, yaks, reindeer, water buffaloes, and llamas as well as the more familiar pack animals like dogs, horses, donkeys, and mules.

Nomenclature
The term pack animal is traditionally used in contrast to draft animal, which is a working animal that typically pulls a load behind itself (such as a plow, a cart, a sled or a heavy log) rather than carrying cargo directly on its back. For instance, sled dogs pull loads but do not normally carry them, while working elephants have been used for centuries to haul logs out of forests.

The term pack animal can also refer to animals which naturally live and hunt in packs in the wild, such as wolves, hyenas, dogs etc., i.e. pack hunters.

Diversity
Traditional pack animals include ungulates such as camels, the domestic yak, reindeer, goats, water buffaloes and llama, and domesticated members of the horse family including horses, donkeys, and mules.  Occasionally, dogs can be used to carry small loads.

Pack animals by region 
 Arctic - Reindeer and sled dogs
 Central Africa and Southern Africa - Oxen, mules, donkeys
 Eurasia - Donkeys, oxen, Horses, mules
 Central Asia - Bactrian camels, yaks, Horses, mules, donkeys
 South and Southeast Asia - Water buffaloes, yaks, Asian elephants
 North America - Horses, mules, donkeys, goats
 North Africa and Middle East - Dromedaries, horses, donkeys, mules, oxen
 Oceania - Donkeys, horses, dromedaries, mules, oxen
 South America - Llamas, donkeys, mules

Uses

Hauling of goods in wagons with horses and oxen gradually displaced the use of packhorses, which had been important until the Middle Ages, by the sixteenth century.

Pack animals may be fitted with pack saddles and may also carry saddlebags. Alternatively, a pair of weighted materials (often placed symmetrically) are called panniers.

While traditional usage of pack animals by nomadic tribespeople is declining, a new market is growing in the tourist expeditions industry in regions such as the High Atlas mountains of Morocco, allowing visitors the comfort of backpacking with animals.  The use of pack animals "is considered a valid means of viewing and experiencing" some National Parks in America, subject to guidelines and closed areas.

In the 21st century, special forces have received guidance on the use of horses, mules, llamas, camels, dogs, and elephants as pack animals.

Load carrying capacity 
The maximum load for a camel is roughly 300 kg.

Yaks are loaded differently according to region. In Sichuan,  is carried for 30 km in 6 hours.

Loads for equids are disputed.

Reindeer can carry up to 40 kg for a prolonged period in mountains.

See also
 Pack station

References

External links

Llama Backpacking Documentary produced by Oregon Public Broadcasting

 
Domesticated animals
Animal-powered transport
Military animals